Baha Al-Dowleh Razi was an Iranian physician who lived in the 9th century. He was one of the greatest Iranian traditional medicine practitioners. He was likely born in Tehran, where he also completed his medical studies with his father.

Innovation
Razi discovered many innovations in the field of detecting diseases such as whooping cough and syphilis. He also gave an early description of epithelial tuft cells and their possible role in the immune system and allergies. He implemented an early form of smallpox vaccination. He is the main source for a  paper . He used his father's techniques and followed him in Sufism and the elders of the way of life of the late 'King Hussein',  entering Herat Afzal Nasir al-Din al-Kirmani monastery.

Kholaseh Al-Tajarob 
His short book "Kholaseh Al-tajarob" was one of the most respected authorities in the 'Safavieh' era of medicine. Doctors studied his father and other physicians such as, Hippocrates, Galen, bin Razi, Ibn Sina, SE Jorjani and an ophthalmologist named Amira. 

Although the extent of topics and eloquently expressed Al-tajarob summary 'Kharazmshahi' not to save, the better it is based on personal experience and innovation.

Death 
Baha Al-Dowleh died, according to the death of 'King Hussein Bayghara', circa year 915.

See also 
 List of Persian scientists and scholars

References 
 Cyril Elgood, A Medical History of Persia and the Eastern Caliphate (Cambridge: Cambridge University Press, 1951; reprinted Amsterdam: APA-Academic Publishers, 1979), pp. 379–82.

9th-century Iranian physicians
910s deaths
Year of birth unknown
Year of death uncertain